Nelson Iván Serrano Sáenz (born September 15, 1938) is a former Ecuadorian businessman and a naturalized American citizen (since 1971) who was convicted of murdering Frank Dosso, Diane Patisso, George Patisso, and George Gonsalves in the town of Bartow, Polk County, Florida, on December 3, 1997. The jury pronounced him guilty and recommended the death penalty for Serrano in October 2006 after he was convicted of the murders. On June 26, 2007, Judge Susan Roberts sentenced him to death by lethal injection for each of these crimes. Serrano's conviction is controversial, and his culpability has been disputed.

Background
On December 3, 1997, Frank Dosso, Diane Patisso, George Patisso, and George Gonsalves were found shot execution-style at the Erie Manufacturing plant in Bartow. Diane Patisso, a young state prosecutor, had gone to pick up her brother Frank and her husband George at the factory that evening, and prosecutors say she was murdered to prevent her from identifying the killer.

Dosso and Gonsalves accused Serrano of graft, then theft, but investigators, including the FBI, dismissed these accusations. Although there was no physical evidence at the scene to link Nelson Serrano to the crime, relatives of the victims immediately suspected Nelson Serrano, a former partner and CEO of the business. They had been in a bitter dispute with the others over his partners' removal of $1 million without his knowledge. However, millions of dollars were removed from corporate bank accounts after Serrano left the company, and only Dosso and Gonsalves had access to them. The money's whereabouts were never presented during the trial and remain unknown.

During the summer of 1997, Nelson Serrano opened a separate business checking account with a different bank. He deposited two checks totaling over $200,000 from Erie's sister company Garment Conveyor Systems, as requested by corporate counsel to keep monies safe from Dosso and Gonsalves. There were disagreements about the distribution of assets and accusations by Serrano that there were two sets of books. Serrano instituted a civil suit against his partners. Ultimately, Serrano was removed as president by a vote of the other two partners, and Serrano left the companies. After that, the locks were changed on the building. Shortly before Serrano was ousted as CEO, Phil Dosso and George Gonsalves had fired Serrano’s son, Francisco. Prosecutors said Serrano was angry because Gonsalves and Felice "Phil" Dosso, the third partner in the business, had ousted him and his son from both companies.

Numerous Erie employees testified to the strained relations between Serrano and the other two partners, particularly Serrano‘s dislike of Gonsalves. Serrano made statements indicating that he wished Gonsalves were deceased. Another Erie employee testified that, weeks before the murders, a plant employee came to work with a gun and threatened to kill George. He was calmed down and sent home.

Authorities said both Serrano men had the motive to commit the murders, but Francisco Serrano provided an alibi. His father told authorities he was in an Atlanta hotel room with a migraine headache all day, so no one saw him or talked to him. But, almost three years later, law enforcement agents found his fingerprint on a parking garage receipt at Orlando International Airport dated 3:49 p.m. on Dec. 3, about two hours before the slayings occurred. Prosecutors felt that piece of evidence broke his alibi. However, the state's fingerprint expert stated the fingerprint was suspicious because of how it was found, because the print was from Serrano's right hand (a driver is more likely to take the ticket from the machine with his left hand) and because there were no other prints or smudges on the ticket.

In a court hearing in September 2013, Prosecutors admitted to withholding from defense counsel the testimony of the only eyewitness to the murder scene, John Purvis. Purvis stated that he witnessed an Asian young man ("one of those slanty-eyed people") between the ages of 25-30 outside of the main entrance to Erie and a young Latin man in the building looking out of the glass at or around the time investigators estimate the murders occurred. The victims were found in an office about 50 feet from the main entrance, suggesting that others were also involved. He also stated that a Lincoln or Cadillac was parked outside. The new attorneys for Serrano, headed by attorney Roy Black had also uncovered that prosecutors withheld from trial defense attorneys the fact that an extradition process had already begun one week before Serrano's illegal deportation and state attorney Paul Wallace traveled to Ecuador, misled government officials to seek deportation obstructing the federal process of extradition. Paul Wallace, as co-prosecutor during the trial, withheld this information from the court and jury. Nelson's defense has discovered that the Florida prosecutor and police concealed a third weapon used in the crime, a rifle for exclusive military use.

Serrano claimed that he was on a business trip, 500 miles away in Atlanta, when the killings occurred. However, the prosecutors convinced the 12-member trial jury that Serrano had flown by airliner to Florida under assumed names to commit the premeditated murders. Then he had quickly flown back to Atlanta from a different major airport to attempt to establish an alibi by appearing on the security video cameras of his hotel. Prosecutors stated that Serrano had tricked his nephew into providing him with a rental car (under a pseudonym) to reach the other airport. Although Bartow is midway between the major airports in Tampa and Orlando, evidence was not shown to prove this trip positively and that murders could be possible during rush hour traffic. Prosecutors and investigators did not find any videos from either airport showing Serrano.

During the trial, Serrano's lawyers fought for a mistrial, claiming that Serrano was illegally deported from Ecuador to the United States. Serrano is an Ecuadorian citizen by birth and a naturalized American citizen (in 1971). In 1971, he renounced his Ecuadorian citizenship to obtain his United States citizenship. Serrano was kidnapped in Ecuador by Florida-hired off-duty police officers and then, according to the Ecuadorian government and the Inter-American Commission on Human Rights (a division of the Organization of American States), illegally deported back to Florida for his murder trial. Documents concerning this issue were presented during the trial and were confirmed by the Ecuadorian Ombudsman through his testimony. Judge Roberts, unaware that an extradition process was started and thwarted by state attorney Wallace, denied the defense motion, finding no cause to dismiss the case.

Ecuadorian officials, seeking his return to that country, claimed Serrano had been beaten and kept in a dog kennel at the airport in Quito after his arrest in Ecuador. Police say Serrano suffered a minor fall injury as he boarded the airliner. An American Airlines flight attendant who witnessed Serrano bleeding from the head with several bruises refused entry to the Florida officials, but the flight Captain allowed them to board.

Judge Roberts denied a defense motion for a change of venue, although one of the victims, Diane Dosso Patisso, was an Assistant State Attorney for Polk County. The judge hid this information from the jury.

The families of the victims have set up a memorial foundation in their honor.
 
Serrano's son, who had also worked at the Bartow plant, claims that his father is innocent and has set up a web site in defense of his father.

Serrano is on death row at a male-only maximum security facility at the Union Correctional Institution in Raiford, Florida.

See also
 List of death row inmates in the United States

References

External links
 CBS news report

1938 births
1997 murders in the United States
Living people
American prisoners sentenced to death
American people convicted of murder
Ecuadorian businesspeople
Ecuadorian emigrants to the United States
Ecuadorian people convicted of murder
Ecuadorian prisoners sentenced to death
Businesspeople from Florida
People convicted of murder by Florida
People from Quito
Prisoners sentenced to death by Florida
American mass murderers
Ecuadorian mass murderers
20th-century businesspeople
20th-century American businesspeople